"Twist It" is a song by American R&B singer Olivia. It was written by Olivia along with David Drew, Michael Clervoix III, Lloyd Banks and Curtis Jackson for her unreleased second studio album, her G-Unit debut Behind Closed Doors, while production on the track was helmed by Jelly Roll. "Twist It" features guest vocals by rapper Banks. Released as the first single from Behind Closed Doors, the song peaked at number 89 on the US Billboard Hot 100.

Music video
A music video for "Twist It" was directed by 50 Cent and Billy Parks and filmed on May 20, 2005. It features cameo appearances by 50 Cent, Tony Yayo, Lil Scrappy, Mobb Deep, M.O.P., DJ Kayslay Winky Wright, and Ron Artest.

Track listing
Digital single
 "Twist It" (featuring Lloyd Banks) – 3:25

Charts

References

2005 singles
Olivia (singer) songs
Lloyd Banks songs
Songs written by Lloyd Banks
G-Unit Records singles
2005 songs